Balan Madhavan is an Indian nature conservation photographer. He is a Senior Fellow of the International League of Conservation Photographers.

Life and work 
Madhavan runs the N Madhavan Pillai Foundation for Conservation Communication, which awards the annual Madhavan Pillai Conservation award to forest guides and workers.

In 2017 he traveled to Antarctica on a photo expedition. An exhibition of the photographs from the expedition he led was held in Thiruvananthapuram.

Madhavan was invited to the membership of the International League of Conservation Photographers in 2009.

Publications 
Sanctuary for the soul of Kerala Tourism
Periyar in Her Elements
Water Taken for Granted

Awards
He was the recipient of the Keizo Yamaji UNEP Photography Prize in 1992. The competition was organized by the United Nations Environment Programme and Canon Inc. and encapsulated the theme "Focus on your world" and prizes were announced at the World Environment Day ceremonies in Rio de Janeiro on 5 June 1992.

References

External links
 

Living people
20th-century Indian photographers
21st-century Indian photographers
Indian wildlife photographers
Photographers from Kerala
Year of birth missing (living people)
People from Thiruvananthapuram